100% Love is a 2011 Indian Telugu-language romantic comedy film directed by Sukumar and produced by Bunny Vasu under the banner Geetha Arts. The film stars Naga Chaitanya and Tamannaah with music composed by Devi Sri Prasad. It revolves around Balu and Mahalakshmi, cousins who share a love–hate relationship.

100% Love which released on 6 May 2011 received positive response from both critics and audience. The film was a commercial success and became one of the Highest grossing Telugu films of that year. The film won two Nandi Awards.

The film was dubbed and released in Malayalam with the same title, on 22 July 2011.  It was remade in Bengali as Prem Ki Bujhini (2016), and in Tamil as 100% Kadhal (2019).

Plot 
The story starts at a bar where Balu is in a wedding outfit and just enters as he orders his drink, two people tell him to go and get married, while they are talking about debts Balu does fast calculations and impresses them. They ask him to tell his story and he does.

Balu is always top-ranked in his college. Mahalakshmi, his cousin comes to Balu's house to continue her studies. She is in awe of her Mr. Perfect 'Bava' as she expresses this after seeing him. Upon seeing Mahalakshmi Balu asks for her name to which she responds as Veera Venkata Satya Sai Naga Durga Sesha Avathara Seetha Mahalakshmi, Balu says her name is too long and he can't waste that much memory just to remember her name so she says that he will just call her Mahalakshmi. Mahalakshmi takes her first exam and walks out crying as she doesn't understand English, Balu helps her, and she gets the first rank and Balu gets second. Balu is hurt by this as he usually gets first rank, and he plans to sabotage her studies, Mahalakshmi does the same. But to their surprise Ajith (Anand Krishna Nandu) stands first this time. Meanwhile, Mahalakshmi's father brings her a marriage proposal, but she doesn't want to marry him. Balu and Mahalakshmi compromise by agreeing to help each other. Balu helps her in getting the proposal canceled and Mahalakshmi distracts Ajith from studies for the sake of Balu, but Balu gets attracted to her. The couple start studying together and Mahalakshmi distracts Ajith. Balu gets first rank and is awarded a building from his principal, at the housewarming party, Mahalakshmi says Ajith is great as he studied well even though Mahalakshmi distracted him. Balu is hurt by this statement because he doesn't want Mahalakshmi to think anyone is better than him, his ego is also hurt and the couple chooses to separate.

After three years, they meet again in the hospital because their grandmother suddenly falls ill. While trying to find out how Balu is doing, Mahalakshmi realizes he hasn't changed at all. Both argue a lot until their parents try to get them married. Surprisingly, Balu mentions that he has a girlfriend named Swapna that he hopes to marry. While introducing her to his family, Mahalakshmi notices that Swapna is much more than she is. To get back at Balu, she agrees to marry Ajith, Balu's former rival in college. Ajith turns out to be the head of a company that makes more than Balu's company. Balu, angry that Ajith is greater than he is, puts his company in risk in hopes that he can surpass Ajith's company. Unfortunately, his partner cheats him, and Balu is on the verge of losing his company. Mahalakshmi, now his project manager, toils to rescue him. They make an excellent team and Balu's company is saved.

In an after party, Balu credits Mahalakshmi for his success. She again unknowingly hurts Balu's ego. This time, Balu confesses that he felt the need to be great in Mahalakshmi's eyes because he loved her. When she tells him she shares her feelings, Balu refuses to believe her. After the interference of their grandfather, they are united in the end.

Cast

Production

Before the completion of Arya 2, Sukumar had discussed making the film with Geetha Arts with Varun Sandesh and Tamannaah, but the film failed to materialize. February 2010, the project was announced with a statement reporting the collaboration of Geetha Arts, Sukumar and Naga Chaitanya for the film mentioned. The subsequent month saw Tamannaah announce that she had signed on to portray the lead female role in the project. The film was launched at Annapoorna Studios, Hyderabad on 8 June 2010 with several leading Telugu film personalities being involved with the event. Noted producer D. Ramanaidu rendered the launch, another producer Nagababu switched on the camera and Naga Chaitanya's father actor Nagarjuna clapped the first shot. The formal first shot direction was done by S. S. Rajamouli and Akkineni Nageswara Rao handed over the script to the director.

The film continued its shoot untitled officially until 20 March 2011 when the title 100% Love was formally announced. During the production of the film, several titles were reported in the media for the project including Balu Weds Mahalakshmi, I Love You, I Love You Mahalakshmi, I Hate Mahalakshmi and I am Number One. Despite having an original planned release of December 2010, strikes if the industry pushed the release date to April 2011.

Music

The music and background score was composed by Sukumar's regular associate Devi Sri Prasad. The album consisted of 8 songs which included 2 bit songs in the first release and 2 another bit songs in the next release. Chandrabose, Ramajogayya Sastry and Sri Mani penned the Lyrics. The album was released on 2 April 2011 at Rock Gardens in Hyderabad in a star-studded promotional event on Aditya Music label, with the audio being launched by Nagarjuna, Allu Arjun and Ram Pothineni. Upon release, 100% Love received positive response from critics as well as audience thus making it one of the best selling soundtracks of the year 2011.

Reception 
The film is said to be the only film of Naga Chaitanya after Ye Maaya Chesave and for Sukumar after Arya, completing 50 days in 65 centres in Andhra. The film completed its 100th day theatrical run on 13 August 2011.

Accolades
Nandi Awards
Best Child Actor - Master Nikhil
Best Home - Viewing Feature Film - Bunny Vasu

CineMAA Awards
 Won - Best Actress - Tamannaah

TSR - TV9 National Film Awards
 Won - Best Heroine - Tamannaah

Hyderabad Times Film Awards
 Won - Best Actress - Tamannaah

59th Filmfare Awards South
 Nominated - Best Film – Telugu - Geetha Arts/Bunny Vasu
 Nominated - Best Director – Telugu - Sukumar
 Nominated - Best Actress – Telugu - Tamannaah 
 Nominated - Best Music Director – Telugu - Devi Sri Prasad
 Nominated - Best Female Playback Singer – Telugu - Swathi Reddy – "A Square B Square"

1st South Indian International Movie Awards
 Nominated - Best Film (Telugu) - Geetha Arts/Bunny Vasu
 Nominated - Best Director (Telugu) - Sukumar
 Nominated - Best Cinematographer (Telugu) - Venkat Prasad
 Nominated - Best Actor (Telugu) - Naga Chaitanya 
 Nominated - Best Actress (Telugu) - Tamannaah 
 Nominated - Best Music Director (Telugu) - Devi Sri Prasad 
 Nominated - Best Lyricist (Telugu) - Chandrabose – "Infatuation"
 Nominated - Best Male Playback Singer (Telugu) - Adnan Sami – "Infatuation" 
 Nominated - Best Female Playback Singer (Telugu) - Swathi Reddy – "A Square B Square"

References

External links
 

2011 films
Indian romantic comedy films
2011 romantic comedy films
Telugu films remade in other languages
Indian films with live action and animation
Films shot in Hyderabad, India
Films shot at Ramoji Film City
Films set in Andhra Pradesh
2010s Telugu-language films
Films directed by Sukumar
Films scored by Devi Sri Prasad